Gold Coast Historic District can refer to:
 Gold Coast Historic District (Chicago)
 Gold Coast Historic District (Omaha, Nebraska)
 Gold Coast Historic District (Richland, Washington)